The European Business and Technology Centre (EBTC) was constituted in 2008 as a programme co-funded by the European Union. It transitioned to an independent organisation in March 2016, continuing the EU mandate to facilitate Europe-India cross-border collaboration. EBTC as an organisation is coordinated by EUROCHAMBRES, the Association of European Chambers of Commerce and Industry.

The EBTC is headquartered in New Delhi.

History 
It was during the ninth EU-India Summit in Marseille that EU and Indian leaders discussed regional situations, global issues, and the strengthening of EU-India relations. On 29 September 2008, the EU and India approved the launch of EBTC in India to support business-to-business and research co-operation between the EU and India. The project officially launched in October 2008, with an office in New Delhi and activities commencing in January 2009. By 2011, its presence had expanded pan-India, with regional offices in Mumbai and Kolkata. Another office opened in Bangalore in 2013.

In January 2013, India became the 54th country to join the Enterprise Europe Network. The EBTC leads the Enterprise Europe Network India consortium along with its partners, the Federation of Indian Export Organisations (FIEO) and the Confederation of Indian Industry (CII) / Global Innovation & Technology Alliance (GITA), to provide business support services primarily to SME's and entrepreneurs from the EU and India.

The EU-funded project ended on 29 February 2016, and EBTC is now an independent, self-sustainable company. The physical presence has been recentered on Delhi and Bangalore, but activities continue on a pan-Indian level, with partners (local governments, municipalities, organisations, companies) in many states, from Uttar Pradesh to Tamil Nadu...

Mission 
EBTC is promoting and indigenising European technologies as well as innovations to suit the local needs in India through various projects, programmes and initiatives, enabling Indo-European collaborations. EBTC endeavours to support the governments and private sector in India with in-depth information, knowledge of available technologies and frameworks, as well as access to the innovations and solutions created in European countries.

Since its inception, EBTC has played a vital role in creating viable ecosystems for the EU cleantech sector to explore business and research opportunities in India. EBTC is actively supporting European innovations, technologies and solutions for the Indian market entry as a strategic advisor, from finding the right partner or project and facilitating collaborations and joint value propositions, to providing IPR advice, technology adaptation strategies, market exploration studies and inbound/outbound delegations.

All of the above contributes to creating pilot projects on the ground. As an interlocutor on Europe-India policy issues, EBTC is striving to highlight matters pertaining to barriers restricting cross-border trade. Its vision hence is to become a single point of contact for the facilitation of EU-India collaborations. As part of its mandate to enhance EU-India cooperation, EBTC is also actively promoting Indian technologies to European counterparts.

Partners 
EBTC partners with organisations from across the EU and India. Alongside lead partners EUROCHAMBRES, other partners include the Baltic Innovation Agency.
Basildon Borough Council.
Centro Estero Internazionalizzazione Piemonte.
CleanTuesday.
Danish Technological Institute.
Dublin Chamber of Commerce.
European Institute for Asian Studies.
Europe India Chamber of Commerce.
The Fraunhofer Society.
The EuroIndia Centre.
Vision on Technology (VITO).
EuroIndia Research Centre.
Indo-French Chamber of Commerce and Industry.
Indo-Italian Chamber of Commerce and Industry.

References

External links 
 European Business and Technology Centre

Business organizations based in Europe